Daguet (French pronunciation: ['daɡɛ]) is a French word for the Brocket deer), it can refer to any of the following:

French Military
 Opération Daguet, the codename for French operations during the 1991 Gulf War
 Division Daguet, a French Army division formed in September 1990
 Camouflage Daguet, desert camouflage

People
 Dominique Daguet (1938-2021), French writer, poet and journalist